Smart Bar Chicago 1985 is a live album by American alternative rock band Sonic Youth, released on November 13, 2012, on Goofin' Records. It features a live 4-track recording of the band's performance at the Smart Bar in Chicago, Illinois, on August 11, 1985, during the tour in support of Sonic Youth's second studio album, Bad Moon Rising (1985).

Release
Smart Bar Chicago 1985 was released on November 13, 2012, on Goofin' Records. It was announced for release on September 10 on the band's official web site and "Intro"/"Brave Men Run" was made available for streaming on YouTube on October 15. The album was issued on CD, double LP and as a digital download from online retailers. Upon its release, it charted in Belgium, peaking at No. 182 on Wallonia's Ultratop chart.

Reception

Upon its release, Smart Bar Chicago 1985 received positive acclaim from critics. AllMusic reviewer Fred Thomas awarded it 4.5 stars out of 5 and wrote, "The band sounds locked into a collective meditation for much of the set, stringing together the long and discordant segments of songs into a mostly uninterrupted hour and change of sound." Thomas later added, "Without besting the album versions, almost every song here offers a more vivid, more extreme counterpoint to its better-known studio side" and summarized the album as "unpolished, tormented, hungry, and constantly threatening to crumble into godless noise." Writing for Drowned in Sound, Noel Gardner said, "On 'Brave Men Run (In My Family)', [Steve] Shelley elevates it with a near-classic rock fluidity to his playing [...] 'I Love Her All the Time' feels like a Moore vehicle, much like on record, but has great gobs of anti-rock no wave atmos; 'Ghost Bitch' is considerably more abrasive here, [Kim] Gordon sounding less like a coffee house poet than an untamed punk vocalist—Penelope Houston, say." Gardner rated the album 7 out of 10 and summarized: "Smart Bar – Chicago 1985 is not going to change perceptions of either Sonic Youth or live albums: it's a decent recording strictly for fans." Describing the album as "a taste of glories to come", Rolling Stone writer Rob Sheffield awarded the album 3.5 out of 5 stars and noted "Expressway to Yr Skull" and "Secret Girl" as highlights, adding, "The peak is the early ballad 'I Love Her All the Time'—noisy, emotionally alive, jittery with excitement for the future." In his review in Smart Bar Chicago 1985s liner notes, Aaron Mullan referred to the album as "brilliant" and the show itself as "a killer show." He added, "The material is also so visceral and improvisatory that it greatly benefits from the additional perspective offered by a live recording."

Track listing

Personnel
All personnel credits adapted from Smart Bar Chicago 1985s liner notes.

Sonic Youth
Thurston Moore – vocals, guitar
Kim Gordon – vocals, bass
Lee Ranaldo – guitar, layout, photography
Steve Shelley – drums, mixing

Technical personnel
Rich Menning – recording
Aaron Mullan – mixing, liner notes
John Golden – mastering

Design personnel
Cody Ranaldo – artwork
Steve Koress – photography
Pat Blashil – photography
Gerard Cosloy – liner notes

Chart positions

References

External links

2012 live albums
Sonic Youth live albums